Bill Nunn (1953–2016) was an American actor.

William, Bill or Billy Nunn may also refer to:

 William Nunn (1879–1971), British Conservative Party politician
 Bill Nunn (politician) (born 1932), Australian politician
 Bill Nunn (American football) (1924–2014), American sportswriter, newspaper editor and football scout
 Bill Nunn (Australian footballer) (born 1951), Australian rules footballer
 Billy Nunn, keyboard player with the Stone City Band on Rick James' debut album, Come Get It!

See also
 William Nunn Lipscomb Jr. (1919–2011), American Nobel Prize winning chemist